Club Social y Deportivo Universidad Tecnológica Equinoccial is a multi-sports club based in Quito, Ecuador known for their professional football team. They currently play in the country's third-level football league—the Segunda Categoría. They played one season in the second tier Serie B in 2010

External links
Official webpage of the football team 

UTE
UTE
Association football clubs established in 1986
1986 establishments in Ecuador